The South Australian Ornithologist is the scientific journal of the South Australian Ornithological Association (also known as Birds SA). The journal was first published in 1914 and is usually issued twice a year to members of the association.

See also 
List of ornithology journals

References

Further reading 
 Collier, R.; Hatch, J.; Matheson, B.; & Russell, T. (2000). Birds, Birders and Birdwatching, 1899-1999. South Australian Ornithological Association: Adelaide.

External links 
 

Journals and magazines relating to birding and ornithology
Publications established in 1914
English-language journals
Biannual journals